Perrie Louise Edwards (born 10 July 1993) is an English singer. She rose to prominence in the 2010s as a member of the British girl group Little Mix, one of the world's best-selling girl groups. With Little Mix, she released six studio albums and achieved five number-one singles on the UK Singles Chart. In 2021, she became the first female ambassador for the brand "Supreme Nutrition", and in the same year launched her own fashion brand called Disora.

Early life
Perrie Louise Edwards was born on 10 July 1993, to parents Deborah "Debbie" Duffy and Alexander Edwards, who separated when she was young and both remarried. Edwards was raised in the Whiteleas area of South Shields, Tyne and Wear. alongside her brother named Jonnie Edwards and paternal half-sister named Caitlin Edwards. She is of English, Scottish, Irish and Swedish heritage.

Edwards attended Radipole Primary School in Weymouth, Dorset before moving back to South Shields. She attended St. Peter and Paul RC Primary School, and Mortimer Community College in South Shields, and later transferred to Newcastle College, where she received a BTEC in Performing Arts. Edwards lived in Hamilton, New Zealand for two years as a preteen.

Career

2011–2022: Career beginnings and Little Mix Hiatus 
Her first audition on The X Factor was "You Oughta Know" by Alanis Morissette. After she failed the first bootcamp challenge to progress through to the Girls category (solo females aged 16–24), Edwards was then placed in a four-piece group named "Faux Pas" alongside Jesy Nelson. Jade Thirlwall and Leigh-Anne Pinnock were in another group called "Orion". Both groups, however, failed to progress. Later, a decision was made by the judges to bring back the four to form the four-piece group Rhythmix, and they progressed to judges' houses. They eventually reached the live shows and were mentored by Tulisa Contostavlos. On 28 October 2011, it was announced that the band's new name would be Little Mix. On 11 December 2011, Little Mix were announced as the winners, making them the first band ever to win the British version of the show.

Edwards has released six albums and one greatest hits album with the band, DNA (2012), Salute (2013), Get Weird (2015), Glory Days (2016), LM5 (2018), Confetti (2020) and Between Us (2021). In 2019, she became the new face for the Italian brand Superga and released her first designed collection of shoes. In 2020, Edwards become the first female ambassador for the brand "Supreme Nutrition". Later that year, Edwards was revealed as the new face of Nando's, a Portuguese-African food franchise. She also appeared in their television advertisements.

2023: Journey as a solo artist and new projects

Edwards first teased her lifestyle and fashion brand, Disora, in late 2020, when she changed her Instagram bio link to the Disora website. The brand launched on 22 October 2021. Disora have described themselves as a "contemporary luxury" brand. As of November 2022, Edwards estimated net worth is 17.5 million, appearing on the Sunday Times Rich List, for the first time. In February 2023, Edwards began posting recording solo on a studio both London and Los Angeles on her Instagram account.

Personal life
In 2012 during the recording stages for the group's debut album DNA, Edwards had to undergo surgery to remove her inflamed tonsils. In the same year of May 2012, she began dating British singer Zayn Malik, after they met when she was a contestant on The X Factor UK in 2011. In August 2013 the couple had announced their engagement but later separated in August 2015. 

In November 2016, Edwards began dating English professional footballer Alex Oxlade-Chamberlain, but their relationship was not confirmed until February in 2017. On 10 May 2021, she announced that she was expecting her first child with Oxlade-Chamberlain. On 21 August 2021, she gave birth to their son, Axel. In an interview for Women's Health, Edwards spoke about her struggles with breastfeeding. she added "Every night I'd be up breastfeeding Axel, so shattered my eyes would be falling out my head. I'd think of Leigh-Anne and the fact she had to do this with two. she needs a medal! One baby is massively intense enough, never mind two. I don't get how she does it." On 18 June 2022, the pair announced their engagement.

Edwards was born with oesophageal atresia, which is responsible for the bisectional scar on her stomach, and anosmia. As a child she underwent several operations because of the condition. In 2017, she was scheduled to perform alongside Little Mix in Las Vegas, but was hospitalized due to suffering from gastric problems. In August 2018, she revealed via Instagram that she received further treatment on her throat for her oesophageal condition. In April 2019, Edwards shared her struggles with panic attacks and anxiety through Instagram and was interviewed on the subject by Glamour Magazine.

On 27 September 2022, Edwards and Oxlade-Chamberlain were at home with their son Axel, when burglars broke in and stole items such as jewellery and handbags. Both couple were downstairs at the time, and police were called to the incident.

Discography

Songwriting credits

Filmography

References

External links

1993 births
Living people
21st-century English women singers
21st-century English singers
People from South Shields
Musicians from Tyne and Wear
English women pop singers
Little Mix members
Feminist musicians
English people of Swedish descent
English people of Irish descent
English people of Scottish descent
Association footballers' wives and girlfriends